The 4th/6th (County Fermanagh and County Tyrone) Battalion, Ulster Defence Regiment was formed in 1991 as a result of an amalgamation between the 4th Battalion, Ulster Defence Regiment and the 6th Battalion, Ulster Defence Regiment. The resultant 4/6 UDR was subsumed into the Royal Irish Rangers in 1992 as part of the amalgamation which formed the Royal Irish Regiment.

Uniform, armament & equipment

See: Ulster Defence Regiment Uniform, armament & equipment

Greenfinches

Notable personnel
 :Category:Ulster Defence Regiment soldiers
 :Category:Ulster Defence Regiment officers

See also
Ulster Defence Regiment
List of battalions and locations of the Ulster Defence Regiment

Bibliography

 A Testimony to Courage – the Regimental History of the Ulster Defence Regiment 1969 – 1992, John Potter, Pen & Sword Books Ltd, 2001, 
 The Ulster Defence Regiment: An Instrument of Peace?, Chris Ryder 1991 
  Lost Lives, David McKittrick, Mainstream, 2004,

References

Military history of County Fermanagh
Military history of County Tyrone
Battalions of the Ulster Defence Regiment
1991 establishments in the United Kingdom
1992 disestablishments in the United Kingdom
Military units and formations established in 1991
Military units and formations disestablished in 1992